Cobalt ferrite is a semi-hard ferrite with the chemical formula of CoFe2O4 (CoO·Fe2O3).  The substance can be considered as between soft and hard magnetic material and is usually classified as a semi-hard material.

Applications 
It is mainly used for its magnetostrictive applications like sensors and actuators  thanks to its high saturation magnetostriction (~200 ppm). CoFe2O4 has also the benefits to be rare-earth free, which makes it a good substitute for Terfenol-D. Moreover, its magnetostrictive properties can be tuned by inducing a magnetic uniaxial anisotropy. This can be done by magnetic annealing, magnetic field assisted compaction, or reaction under uniaxial pressure. This last solution has the advantage to be ultra fast (20 min) thanks to the use of spark plasma sintering. The induced magnetic anisotropy in cobalt ferrite is also beneficial to enhance the magnetoelectric effect in composite.

Cobalt ferrite can be also used as electrocatalyst for oxygen evolution reaction and as material for fabricating electrodes for electrochemical capacitors (also named supercapacitors) for energy storage. These uses take advantage of the redox reactions occurring at the surface of the ferrite. Cobalt ferrite prepared with controlled morphology and size to enhance the surface area, and thus the number of active sites, has been published. One disadvantage of the cobalt ferrite for some applications is their low electrical conductivity. Nanostructures of cobalt ferrite with different shape can be synthesized on conducting substrates, such as reduced graphene oxide, to alleviate this disadvantage.

See also
Ferrite

References

Ceramic materials
Ferromagnetic materials
Ferrites